Rumana Islam Kanak Chapa is a Bangladeshi singer. The following is a list of her accolades:

Awards
Bangladesh National Film Awards

Meril Prothom Alo Awards

Bachsas Awards

Ifad Film Club Award

11th Channel i Music Awards
Best Modern Song - won

References

Lists of awards received by Bangladeshi musician